YG Entertainment Inc. is a South Korean multinational entertainment agency established in 1996 by Yang Hyun-suk. The company operates as a record label, talent agency, music production company, event management and concert production company, and music publishing house. In addition, the company operates a number of subsidiary ventures under a separate public traded company, YG Plus, which includes a clothing line, a golf management agency, and a cosmetics brand.

Current artists include Sechs Kies, Big Bang, Akdong Musician, Winner, Blackpink, and Treasure as well as actors and actresses including Kang Dong-won, Choi Ji-woo, Cha Seung-won, Lee Sung-kyung, Jin Kyung, Jang Ki-yong, Yoo In-na, Son Na-eun, and Yoo Seung-ho. Other notable artists include Jeon Somi, who is under YG Entertainment's subsidiary The Black Label.

Former artists include Wheesung, Epik High, 1TYM, BigMama, Gummy, Seven, Minzy, Park Bom, 2NE1, Nam Tae-hyun, Lee Jong-suk, Psy, Seungri, B.I, One, CL, Lee Hi, Jinusean, Sandara Park, T.O.P, Daesung, Bang Yedam and iKON.

History

1996–2005: Hip-hop roots, early success and first generation K-pop

In March 1996, Yang Hyun-suk, a former member of the first-generation K-pop group Seo Taiji and Boys, founded YG Entertainment along with his younger brother Yang Min-suk. The company's first artist was the hip-hop trio Keep Six. When they failed to attract popularity, Yang turned his focus to the duo Jinusean and in 1998 to the debut of 1TYM. Both were successful artists that Yang credits for bringing YG and the hip hop genre into mainstream Korean music.

In 1999, YG's artists released a collaborative album under the name YG Family. The label followed with releases from artists such as Perry, Swi.T, Big Mama, Lexy, Gummy and Wheesung. It also established the "YG Underground" label, which housed 45RPM and Stony Skunk. In 2001, a second YG Family album was released. Among others, it featured the 13-year-old G-Dragon, who was then a trainee.

The agency found success in both Korea and Japan with its first "idol" singer Seven in 2003, who became the company's first artist to attempt to cross over into the US music scene, though his US debut failed to gain momentum.

2006–2011: Mainstream breakthrough

Following Se7en's success, YG formed its first idol group Big Bang in 2006. Despite an initial lukewarm reception, the group's breakthrough the following year and their consistent popularity have made them one of the biggest and most bankable boy bands in the world. This was followed by YG's first successful girl group 2NE1 in 2009, who, prior to their split in 2016, were considered one of the most successful and popular girl groups in South Korea. Similarly to Seven, both groups conducted successful careers in Japan.

In 2010, YG made a highly publicized move into a new building, while the old headquarters became a training facility. In the same year, the company unsuccessfully applied for listing on the stock exchange; it was suspected that this was because the company had too few active music groups and an unstable cash flow, despite an increase in earnings in 2009. Later that year, the label signed established artist Psy.

2012–2016: International recognition and business expansion
2012 brought YG international recognition when Psy's "Gangnam Style" gained worldwide popularity as a viral video. On August 21, it charted at number one on the iTunes Music Video Charts. This feat was a first for a South Korean artist. By November 24, "Gangnam Style" had become the most viewed video in YouTube history, and the first video to surpass a billion views. The song was credited as the main reason for YG's share prices increasing by more than 60 per cent, with the record label subsequently filing its first annual report in 2012 with profits of over 50% after going public on the KOSDAQ the year before.

That same year, the label signed rapper and producer Tablo, leader of the hip hop group Epik High, relaunching his career after a musical hiatus following his Stanford controversy. Tablo's band Epik High later transitioned into the record label following his success.

Yang's increased involvement on competitive reality television series led to several record deals with contestants, starting with K-pop Star’s first season runner-up Lee Hi. Other participants on the show were signed as potential members of the label's future boy groups. On the second season of the show, both the winners, sibling duo Akdong Musician as well as runner-up Bang Ye-dam, signed under the agency. Additionally, the reality program Win: Who is Next was later launched by YG, in which two teams of male trainees competed against each other for the chance to sign a contract with the label to debut as the company's next boy band. The conclusion of the reality series saw the formation of Winner.

In 2014, YG acquired T Entertainment's staff and actors including Cha Seung-won, Im Ye-jin, and Jang Hyun-sung. Additionally, through the acquisition of modelling agency K-Plus, it expanded its acting division through the acting debuts of models Lee Sung-kyung and Nam Joo-hyuk. YG also signed a contract with actress Choi Ji-woo. French luxury giant LVMH's private equity arm, L Capital Asia, later announced that it would be investing up to US$80 million in YG. Headquartered in Singapore, L Capital Asia would become the second-largest investor in YG with an 11.5% stake, second only to Yang Hyun-suk's 28%. In 2014 YG also expanded into the beauty industry with the creation of its cosmetics brand Moonshot.

In 2015, YG invested nearly US$100 million in a new Gyeonggi-do-based industrial complex which was slated to be complete by December 2018. Real estate in Seoul worth ₩16 billion (US$14 million) was also purchased for the purpose of expanding their headquarters. In that year, the company also saw the creation of two sub-labels, the first led by Tablo and the second headed by YG producers Teddy Park of 1TYM and Kush of Stony Skunk. Additionally, the members of the losing team from the reality series WIN: Who is Next regrouped and debuted as iKon, along with a new member.

In April 2016, Gong Minji, the youngest member of 2NE1 announced that she had left 2NE1, YG Entertainment stated that the group would continue as a trio. However, in November 2016, YG announced that CL and Dara had renewed their contracts as solo artists, indicating Park Bom's departure from the agency and the disbandment of 2NE1. On January 21, 2017, 2NE1 appeared as a trio and released "Goodbye" as a farewell song that CL wrote when she heard the news of Minji's departure. Sixteen years after the group's disbandment, first-generation K-pop boy band Sechs Kies signed a contract with YG in May 2016 to relaunch their career. Weiying took an 8.2% stake in the company and Tencent a 4.5% stake. YG later added Lee Jong-suk, Kang Dong-won, and Kim Hee-jung to their list of actors. YG debuted their second girl group Blackpink in 2016, their first since 2NE1, followed by the solo rapper One the following year.

2017–2019: Scandals, controversies, and artists' departure
At the end of 2017, YG with  JTBC launched a talent survival show entitled Mix Nine, a contest between trainees from different agencies. Although the winning team was scheduled to debut as idols, YG revealed that the debut for the male winning group had been cancelled. The failure of the show led to incurred losses of ₩7 billion won in the first quarter and ₩4 billion won in the last three months of 2017, causing JYP Entertainment to surpass YG as the second-highest valued K-pop company.

[[File:블랙핑크(BlackPink) - 마지막처럼 171001 코리아뮤직페스티벌.jpg|thumb|left|Blackpink debuted in 2016 and became the first female K-pop group to have four number-one singles on ''Billboards World Digital Song Sales chart.]]

In May 2018, Psy left the company after eight years. Epik High member Tablo announced that his hip-hop group had terminated its contract with YG after six years of working together in October 2018. At the same time, HIGHGRND and it artist have been released from YG and Epik High. In November 2018, YG announced YG Treasure Box, a talent survival show to determine the line-up for their next boy group scheduled to debut in 2019. YG later announced that this event would produce two groups, Treasure and Magnum, both of whom would be active as Treasure 13.

In 2019, the Burning Sun scandal involving Big Bang Seungri heated up and resulted in Seungri's decision to retire from the entertainment industry so that he could focus on the legal case that dragged his name, he officially announced his retirement on March 11, 2019. Comedian Yoo Byung-jae decided to leave YG before his contract ended, after this scandal further dragged the name of the agency. In early June 2019, B.I, the leader of iKON, was reported to have attempted to purchase LSD and marijuana illegally in 2016, he announced his apology to fans and declared his departure from iKON and YG Entertainment. YG Executive Producer, Yang Hyunsuk was also reported to have colluded with the police to cover up the B.I case, In addition, Yang is also accused of money laundering, illegal gambling, and preparing sexual services for potential investors. Due to this series of scandals and controversies, Yang Hyun Suk resigned from all his positions at the agency. Likewise, his younger brother, Yang Min Suk, relinquished his position as CEO of YG Entertainment as a form of accountability. This resignation was officially announced on June 14, 2019. Then CFO Hwang Bo-kyung was appointed as the new CEO of YG on June 20, 2019 In July 2019, rapper One announced that he had parted ways with YG and founded his own sole agency. Following 2NE1's disbandment in 2016, CL announced that she would not be renewing her contract with YG Entertainment in November 2019. At the end of December 2019, solo singer Lee Hi announced that YG was no longer her agency, not long after that she released a new album with AOMG.

2020–present: Recent developments

In 2020, YG announced plans for Treasure's debut which had been delayed since 2019, Blackpink's first full album and Big Bang's comeback which was eventually delayed until 2022. They were also expected to appear at the 2020 Coachella concert however it got cancelled due to the Covid-19 pandemic. During the first half of 2020, YG's financial growth slowly rebounded after the slump. This was assisted by the direction of its business strategy which was primarily international fan oriented. Domestic public sentiment still had not shown a positive influence, but 70% of YG Entertainment's revenue came from overseas fans, most of which came from IKon's first activities after B.I's departure and G-Dragon's activities in China at the time. During the second half of 2020, YG displayed a positive financial trend due to Treasure's debut album series, Blackpink's full album, Winner's Mino, Yoon's solo activities and AKMU's Suhyun's solo activities. Although not in line with the expected target, this value is thought to be due to COVID-19, which caused some concerts to be cancelled. The construction of the new YG Entertainment building was declared complete in September 2020, this building was chosen as the most luxurious and most expensive entertainment agency building in South Korea.

In January 2021, it was reported that Big Hit Entertainment and its tech division beNX had invested a total of 70 billion won (US$63 million) in YG Entertainment's subsidiary YG Plus, or 17.9% of the company's total shares. This investment was made as a form of strategic collaboration between Big Hit Entertainment, beNX, YG Entertainment, and YG Plus, which will work together in various business areas such as platform, distribution, content, and merchandise. YG Plus is the main distributor of Hybe Corporation's products and beNX (now known as Weverse Company) provides content and a platform for YG artists. On May 4, 2021, The Korea Exchange announced that YG was demoted in status from blue-chip companies to regular mid-sized businesses. The blue-chip status had been acquired in April 2013. The company recorded a net loss of 1.8 billion won and a return on equity of -0.5%. Its main business, music production and management, has experienced operational losses over the past two years.

In 2022, YG Entertainment announced that Treasure will be coming back with their new album, the album will be released in February 2022. After Jinwoo and Seunghoon finished their mandatory military service in January 2022, Winner gathered with a full lineup and announced that they would soon return with a new album and a full lineup after Seungyoon and Mino actively released solo albums during the group's break, YG Entertainment announced that Seungyoon will be releasing a single album in March 2022. Treasure and Winner will be holding concerts in April 2022, separately. In February 2022, YG Entertainment announced that Big Bang would be releasing their first comeback after a hiatus which lasted for five years. In addition, they also announced that T.O.P terminated his contract with YG. On July 1, 2022, Yang Min-suk, brother of YG Entertainment founder, Yang Hyun-suk, returned to the agency after 3 years as co-CEO, joining with the current CEO, Hwang Bo-kyung. On December 26, 2022, it was announced that both Taeyang and Daesung would be leaving YG Entertainment after 16 years; Taeyang will transfer to subsidiary The Black Label whereas Daesung is looking for a new start under a new agency, and both reassured that they will remain BigBang members. On December 30, 2022, YG announced that all remaining members of iKon had decided not to renew their contracts after 7 years in the industry. The debut of YG’s new girl group in seven years, BabyMonster, was also teased.

Partnerships
 Music distribution 
YG Entertainment's records are distributed by the following:
 YG Plus (Overall since 2019), Kakao Entertainment (Specific releases only) – South Korea
 YGEX – Japan
 Tencent - China (online only)
 WMG – rest of Asia (Taiwan, Singapore, Hong Kong, etc.)
 Interscope/UMG - Europe, Oceania, North America, and Japan (for Blackpink & Jeon So-mi 'The Black Label only')
 Universal Records (until 2012), Warner Music Philippines and MCA Music Philippines - Philippines

 Genie Music 

In March 2010, seven record labels in Korea (including the three biggest agencies: YG, SM Entertainment, JYP Entertainment, Star Empire Entertainment, Medialine, CAN Entertainment, and Music Factory) jointly established KMP Holdings, a service platform aiming to provide digital music distribution and television program productions. It was speculated that this was in challenge to the duopoly on music distribution in Korea by Mnet Media and LOEN Entertainment. In November 2012, KMP Holdings was acquired by KT Music. In January 2014, the seven agencies behind KMP Holdings formed a collective bond partnership and purchased 13.48% of KT Music's stocks, leaving parent company KT Corporation with 49.99%.

 YGEX 

YGEX was established on April 12, 2011, as a partnership between Avex and YG for the promotion and release of all YG's material in Japan. Prior to this, YG's Japanese releases had been in partnership with Nexstar Records, a Nippon Columbia label that managed Japanese releases for Seven, and Universal Music Japan (which signed a three-year exclusive contract in 2008 for Big Bang's Japanese releases).

 YGMM 

YGMM was established in May 2021 as a form of collaboration with GMM Grammy, Thailand's largest entertainment company with a capital of 200 billion baht (US$5 billion), the company will focus on entertainment and consulting businesses for concerts, theater and acting. GMM Grammy is one of the longest-serving mainstream entertainment companies in Thailand having a number of music labels along with TV and film productions. GMM Grammy is set to hold a 51% stake in the company, while the other 49% belongs to YG Entertainment.

Other partnerships
United Asia Management
In April 2011, United Asia Management was formed as a joint talent management agency between YG, SM, JYP, KeyEast, AMENT, and Star J Entertainment.

Live Nation
YG first collaborated with Californian concert promotion company Live Nation to produce BigBang's Alive Galaxy Tour (2012). Live Nation subsequently directed 2NE1's New Evolution World Tour (2012) and G-Dragon's One of a Kind World Tour (2013). General Manager of Live Nation Asia, Mats Brandt, said in an interview that the company considered BigBang to have the most potential to become a "global artist".

Asiana Airlines
Asiana Airlines signed a deal with YG in January 2013, providing transportation for its personnel to and from domestic and international destinations in return for advertising.

Subsidiaries

Sub-labels
The Black Label

Following the successful formation of HIGHGRND, on September 22, 2015, YG Entertainment announced the creation of another independent sub-label, to be headed by YG Producer Teddy and Kush. The label currently houses Zion.T, Okasian, Danny Chung (formerly known as Decipher), Vince, Taeyang &  Jeon So-mi.

YGX Entertainment

Yang Hyun-suk announced, in May 2018, that a subsidiary company called YGX Entertainment would merge with Seungri's DJ label NHR. On June 4, on his official Instagram account, he posted a picture of a business card showing Seungri as the CEO of YGX. In 2018, the label launched a dance and vocal academy, called X ACADEMY, where students could potentially be scouted by YG as trainees.

YG Plus

YG Plus Inc., previously named Phoenix Holdings Inc., is a publicly traded media and advertising company acquired by YG Entertainment in November 2014. In 2019, the company entered the music distribution industry and also engages in production, distribution, and licensing of merchandise related to music artists. In January 2021, Hybe Corporation and its technology subsidiary, Weverse Company, acquired 17.9% of the company in a merchandising and distribution deal that would see YG Entertainment's artists join Weverse in return.

Shining Star Culture
Also known as YG China, home to trainees Jane (제인/简) and Vicky (비키/維琪). The sub-label was first announced on Youth With You (season 2).

Former sub-labels
HIGHGRND
HIGHGRND (read as "high ground") was an independent sub-label headed by Epik High's Tablo. Announced in March 2015, the label was set up by Yang Hyun-suk under the YG Entertainment umbrella as part of a long-term goal to reach out to the Korean indie and alternative scene. On June 21, 2015, Tablo introduced the band Hyukoh via Instagram as the label's first official artist. The company had fostered artists Millic, offonoff, Punchnello, Code Kunst, Way Ched, The Black Skirts, Idiotape, and Incredivle ever since.
However, on April 11, 2018, an article was released that HIGHGRND was no longer active due to Tablo's resignation as CEO the previous year. As of the release of this article, the artists in the label soon revealed that they had signed in with other labels and had other companies to distribute their new releases that year.

In June 2019, YG Plus took over the social media accounts of HIGHGRND and relaunched them under the name SEOUL MUSIC.

PSYG
On September 1, 2016, representatives of YG announced that Psy would be leading an independent sub-label titled PSYG, a portmanteau of "Psy" and "YG". The label was registered as a corporate subsidiary in June and marked another chapter in the collaboration between Psy and long-time friend Yang Hyun-suk, as it was revealed that the YG CEO had implicitly promised the creation of a sub-label when Psy had signed on to the company in 2010 amidst personal difficulties, having been encouraged by his wife to work with the YG founder. As Psy left the company in mid-2018, PSYG has ended its operations and closed its doors.

Philanthropy
YG pledged to donate 100 won for every album sold, 1% of all merchandise sales, and 1,000 won for every concert ticket, to charities. In 2009, they raised US$141,000, and in 2010 $160,000. The company has also directly delivered US$4,400 worth of charcoal to families in need during the winter season. It announced that it would be donating around US$500,000 for disaster relief to Japan after the 2011 Tōhoku earthquake and tsunami.

In 2013, Yang Hyun-suk made headlines when he donated all of the dividends he received as a shareholder of YG to help young children needing surgery. His dividends totalled around US$922,000.

In 2015, YG donated a total of ₩100 million (US$92,450) to the Korean Committee for UNICEF in disaster relief following the earthquake in Nepal.

In March 2022, YG donated  million to Hope Bridge Disaster Relief Association to help residents affected by wildfires in Uljin, Gyeongbuk, Samcheok, and Gangwon.

Artists

All musical artists and actors under YG Entertainment are collectively known respectively as YG Family and YG Stage.

Recording artistsGroups Sechs Kies
 BigBang
 AKMU
 Winner
 Blackpink
 Treasure
 BabyMonsterProject Groups GD X TaeyangSoloists Eun Ji-won
 G-Dragon
 Yoon
 Mino
 Jinu
 Jennie
 Lee Su-hyun
 Rosé
 Lisa
 Lee Chan-hyuk
 Jisoo
 KrunkProducers Teddy Park
 Choice37
 Future Bounce
 Kang Uk-jin
 AiRPLAY
 G-Dragon
 Lydia Paek
 Ham Seung-cheon
 iHwak
 Rovin
 Yoon
 Mino
 Lee Chan-hyuk
 R. Tee
 Bekuh Boom
 Diggy
 

Independent artistsThe Black Label Taeyang
 Zion.T
 Okasian
 Jeon Somi
 Vince
 Peejay
 R.TeeYGX Entertainment'''
 Viini

Actors

 Cha Seung-won
 Choi Ji-woo
 Claudia Kim
 Han Seung-yeon
 Jang Hyun-sung
 Jang Ki-yong
 Jin Kyung
 Jung Hye-young
 Joo Woo-jae
 Kal So-won
 Kang Hui
 Kang Seung-yoon
 Kim Hee-ae
 Kim Hyun-jin
 Kim Ji-soo
 Kwon Hyun-bin
 Kyung Soo-jin
 Lee Ho-jung
 Lee Joo-myung
 Lee Ki-taek
 Lee Soo-hyuk
 Lee Sung-kyung
 Nam Kyu-hee
 Park Hyeong-seop
 Park So-yi
 Seo Jeong-yeon
 Shim Young-eun
 Son Na-eun
 Wang Yi-jun
 Yoo In-na
 Yoo Seung-ho

Former artists and actors

Former artists

Yang Hyun-suk (1996–2019)
Keep Six (1996)
Jinusean (1997–2020)
1TYM (1998–2006)
Masta Wu (2000–2016)
Swi.T (2002–2005)
Wheesung (2002–2006)
Gummy (2003–2013)
Big Mama (2003–2007)
Seven (2003–2015)
Digital Masta (2003–2011)
Lexy (2003–2007)
Stony Skunk (2003–2008)
 (2003–2004)
Wanted (2004–2006)
Brave Brothers (2004–2008)
45RPM (2005–2008)
SoulStaR (2005–2007)
Big Bang
Seungri (2006–2019)
T.O.P (2006–2022)
Taeyang (2006–2022)
Daesung (2006–2022)
 GD & TOP (2009–2022)
2NE1 (2009–2016)
Minzy (2009–2016)
Park Bom (2009–2017)
CL (2009–2019)
Dara (2009–2021)
Psy (2010–2018)
Lee Hi (2012–2019)
Epik High (2012–2018)
Winner
Taehyun (2014–2016)
HIGHGRND Artists (2015–2018)
BOM&HI (2014–2017)
Hi Suhyun (2014–2019)
One (2015–2019)
Katie (2015–2018)
Ikon (2015–2022)
B.I (2015–2019)
 Jay (2015–2022)
 Song (2015–2022)
 Bobby (2015–2022)
 DK (2015–2022)
 Ju-ne (2015–2022)
 Chan (2015–2022)
Sechs Kies
Kang Sung-hoon (2016–2019)
MOBB (2016–2019)
Anda (2018–2021)
Treasure
Mashiho (2020–2022)
Bang Ye-dam (2020–2022)

Former actors and actresses

Park Han-byul (2002–2004)
Jung Sung-il (2009–2011)
Heo Yi-jae (2009–2011)
Kang Hye-jung (2001–2013)
Stephanie Lee (2014–2017)
Lee Yong-woo (2014–2017)
Koo Hye-sun (2003–2017)
Jung Yoo-jin (2016–2018)
Lee Jong-suk (2016–2018)
Go Joon-hee (2017–2019)
Oh Sang-jin (2017–2019)
Kim Hee-jung (2016–2019)
Kim Sae-ron (2016–2019)
Im Ye-jin (2014–2019)
Wang Ji-won (2018–2020)
Nam Joo-hyuk (2013–2020)
Dara (2009–2021)
Son Ho-jun (2016–2021)
Jo Hye-joo (2017–2021)
Lee Ji-ni (?–2021)
Jung Yoon-seok (2019–2022)
Kwon Han-sol (2019–2022)
Lee Hyun-wook (?–2022)
Lee Woo-je (–2022)
Park Soo-yeon (?–2022)
Park Tae-in (2019–2022)
Seo Lee-seo (?–2022)
 Gang Dong-won (2016–2022)

Former talents
Yoo Byung-jae (2015–2019)
Ahn Young-mi (2015–2020)

Discography

See also

 Korean hip hop
 List of South Korean musicians

Notes

References

External links

 

 
South Korean companies established in 1996
Companies based in Seoul
Companies listed on KOSDAQ
Cosmetics brands of South Korea
Electronic dance music record labels
Event management companies of South Korea
Hip hop record labels
Labels distributed by Warner Music Group
Labels distributed by CJ E&M Music and Live
Music publishing companies of South Korea
Pop record labels
Publishing companies established in 1996
Record labels established in 1996
Soul music record labels
South Korean brands
South Korean record labels
Sports management companies
Synth-pop record labels
Talent agencies of South Korea
K-pop record labels